George Edward Fern (10 February 1874 – 19 May 1955), sometimes spelt Ferne, was an English footballer who made 24 appearances in the Football League playing for Lincoln City. He played as an outside left. He also played in the Southern League for Millwall Athletic, Watford and Fulham, and in non-league football for Hinckley Town and Coventry City.

References

1874 births
1955 deaths
Sportspeople from Burton upon Trent
English footballers
Association football wingers
Hinckley Town F.C. players
Lincoln City F.C. players
Millwall F.C. players
Watford F.C. players
Fulham F.C. players
Coventry City F.C. players
English Football League players
Southern Football League players